The preliminary round of the UEFA Women's Euro 2017 qualifying competition involved the eight lowest-ranked teams among the 46 qualifying entrants: Andorra, Faroe Islands, Georgia, Latvia, Lithuania, Luxembourg, Malta and Moldova. The draw for the preliminary round, where the eight teams were drawn into two groups of four teams, was held on 19 January 2015.

Each group was played in single round-robin format at the pre-selected hosts. The two group winners advanced to the qualifying group stage.

All times were CEST (UTC+2).

Group 1

Group 2

Goalscorers
5 goals

 Rannvá Andreasen

4 goals

 Heidi Sevdal
 Khatia Tchkonia

3 goals

 Lela Chichinadze
 Tatiana Matveeva
 Liene Vāciete
 Ylenia Carabott
 Dorianne Theuma
 Claudia Chiper

2 goals

 Rasa Imanalijeva
 Amy Thompson
 Rachel Cuschieri

1 goal

 Marina Fernández
 Bibiana Gonçalves
 Alba López
 Lív Arge
 Fríðrún Danielsen
 Milja Simonsen
 Renāte Fedotova
 Sandra Voitāne
 Sonata Vanagaitė
 Jessica Birkel
 Martina Borg
 Ludmila Andone
 Elena Porojniuc

1 own goal

 Ieva Bidermane (playing against Luxembourg)

References

External links
UEFA.com

Preliminary round